Monnetier-Mornex is a commune in the Haute-Savoie department in the Auvergne-Rhône-Alpes region in south-eastern France.

This commune is near Geneva and is made up of three villages, Monnetier (Salève and lesser Salève), the village d'Esserts-Saleve and the village of Mornex. Mornex extends to the bottom of Mont Gosse and is beside the confluence of L'Arve river and its tributary the Viaison.

See also
Communes of the Haute-Savoie department

References

Communes of Haute-Savoie